
Gmina Puławy is a rural gmina (administrative district) in Puławy County, Lublin Voivodeship, in eastern Poland. Its seat is the town of Puławy, although the town is not part of the territory of the gmina.

Villages
Gmina Puławy contains the villages and settlements of Anielin, Borowa, Borowina, Bronowice, Dobrosławów, Gołąb, Góra Puławska, Janów, Jaroszyn, Kajetanów, Klikawa, Kochanów, Kolonia Góra Puławska, Kowala, Łęka, Leokadiów, Matygi, Niebrzegów, Nieciecz, Opatkowice, Pachnowola, Piskorów, Polesie, Sadłowice, Skoki, Smogorzów, Sosnów, Tomaszów, Wólka Gołębska and Zarzecze.

Neighbouring gminas
Gmina Puławy is bordered by the towns of Dęblin and Puławy, and by the gminas of Gniewoszów, Janowiec, Policzna, Przyłęk, Ryki, Sieciechów and Żyrzyn.

References

Polish official population figures 2006

Pulawy
Puławy County